McHugh Peak is a  mountain summit located in the western Chugach Mountains, in Anchorage Municipality, in the U.S. state of Alaska. Reaching the top involves hiking on a ridge trail and scrambling the final summit tor. The hike to McHugh Peak is detailed in several popular guidebooks. This geographic feature's local name was reported in 1942 by the Army Map Service, and was officially adopted in 1969 by the U.S. Board on Geographic Names. The mountain's name is derived from McHugh Creek which drains the south slope of this peak, and the creek's name was first published in 1912 by the U.S. Coast and Geodetic Survey. This mountain is called Q'isqa Dghelaya in the Denaʼina language, meaning Banjo Snowshoe Mountain. "Q'isqa" are temporary snowshoes made of lashed brush.

Climate

Based on the Köppen climate classification, McHugh Peak is located in a subarctic climate zone with long, cold, snowy winters, and mild summers. Temperatures can drop below −20 °C with wind chill factors below −30 °C. Precipitation runoff from the peak drains into McHugh, Potter, and Rabbit Creeks, which empty into Turnagain Arm three miles from the summit.

See also

List of mountain peaks of Alaska
Geology of Alaska

References

Gallery

External links
 Weather forecast: McHugh Peak
 McHugh Peak: weather webcam
 Climbing McHugh: YouTube
 Climbing information: Winterbear.com

Mountains of Alaska
Mountains of Anchorage, Alaska
North American 1000 m summits
Denaʼina